Dénes Olasz (born 16 December 1988) is a Hungarian professional footballer who plays for Eger SE.

References
MLSZ 
HLSZ 

1988 births
Living people
People from Mezőkövesd
Hungarian footballers
Association football forwards
Mezőkövesdi SE footballers
Kazincbarcikai SC footballers
Fehérvár FC players
Putnok VSE footballers
Lombard-Pápa TFC footballers
Kaposvári Rákóczi FC players
FC Ajka players
Salgótarjáni BTC footballers
Szolnoki MÁV FC footballers
Ceglédi VSE footballers
Békéscsaba 1912 Előre footballers
Nemzeti Bajnokság I players
Nemzeti Bajnokság II players
Sportspeople from Borsod-Abaúj-Zemplén County